Victor Manuel Rojas (born February 3, 1968) is an American baseball executive and former broadcaster. He currently serves as the president and general manager of the Frisco RoughRiders. Rojas is best known for his time with the Los Angeles Angels as their play-by-play broadcaster from 2010–2020.

Playing career
Rojas is the son of former major-league player and manager Cookie Rojas. Born in Miami, Florida and raised in Overland Park, Kansas, Rojas graduated from Blue Valley High School and later attended and played college baseball as a pitcher at Piedmont College (1988) Demorest, Georgia. Rojas played college baseball as a pitcher and catcher at the College of the Desert in Palm Desert, California, and Lewis-Clark State College in Lewiston, Idaho. He pitched in the California Angels minor league system in the early 1990s.

Coaching career
He was a member of the Florida Marlins baseball staff in 1993 serving as the bullpen catcher during the inaugural season. He was the pitching coach for the Rio Grande Valley White Wings of the independent Texas–Louisiana League in 1994.

Broadcasting career

Early jobs
Rojas was a radio and television announcer for the Newark Bears of the independent Atlantic League for two years, and also served as the franchise's general manager. He worked as a  broadcaster for MLB Radio in 2002 and 2003 on the All-Star Game and the Arizona Fall League.

He moved up to the radio booth for the Arizona Diamondbacks in 2003.

Texas Rangers
He joined the Rangers in 2004, replacing Vince Cotroneo (now with the Oakland Athletics). Rojas worked with lead announcer Eric Nadel on all regular-season games and a number of spring training games. He did play-by-play for two pairs of the middle innings (3–4 and 6–7) and provided color commentary for Nadel during the other innings. He has worked multiple Rangers games on television as a fill-in announcer for regular play-by-play man Josh Lewin or color commentator Tom Grieve, and he has also appeared on ESPN.

MLB Network
Rojas was the first personality to appear on camera when MLB Network launched on January 1, 2009, serving as the first host on Hot Stove (the Network's off-season studio show).  Along with Hot Stove, he appeared on MLB Tonight, the network's signature nightly studio program.  Rojas also called play-by-play for some of MLB Network's Thursday Night Baseball telecasts.

Los Angeles Angels
On March 3, 2010, Rojas was named the Los Angeles Angels of Anaheim's TV play-by-play announcer for Fox Sports West, succeeding Rory Markas who died in January and TV play-by-play announcer Steve Physioc and former Major League Baseball player and game analyst Rex Hudler, whose contracts expired after the 2009 season. He is partnered with color commentator Mark Gubicza on the broadcasts. 

Rojas was hired by TBS to handle play-by-play duties for the 2011 NLDS featuring the Arizona Diamondbacks and the Milwaukee Brewers.

In 2019, Rojas and Gubicza won a Los Angeles Emmy Award for their broadcast of Albert Pujols' 3000th hit.

In November 2020, Rojas revealed that he had interviewed with the Los Angeles Angels for their vacant general manager position. The job eventually went to former Atlanta Braves assistant general manager Perry Minasian.

On January 9, 2021, Rojas announced via Twitter that he would be stepping away from broadcasting to focus on his family and apparel company. Matt Vasgersian would take Rojas' Spot.

Play calls
 "Oppo taco": Opposite field home run
 "Three-run jimmy jack": Three-run home run
 "Big fly": A home run
 "Light that baby up!": The call at the final out of an Angels win, referring to the halo on the 230-foot tall A outside of Angel Stadium that lights up when the Angels win. 
 "Drive home safely!": When the Angels have a walk-off win.
"Grand salami time!": When the Angels hit a grand slam.
”Big fly, Ohtani-san!”: Home run call for Japanese player Shohei Ohtani, making use of the Japanese honorific "san"

Executive career
On January 11, 2021, it was announced that Rojas had been hired by Texas Rangers Double-A affiliate Frisco RoughRiders as their president and general manager.

Personal life
Rojas and his wife, Kim have three children. He and his family started a baseball apparel business in 2019 called Big Fly Gear. His father Cookie was an MLB player for 15 seasons and a manager for two. He is also in broadcasting, currently doing Spanish color commentary for the Miami Marlins. His brother Mike was the manager for the Northwest Arkansas Naturals, the Double-A affiliate to the Kansas City Royals and is currently coaching in Mexico.

Rojas and his family currently reside in Trophy Club, Texas.

References

External links

Victor Rojas Los Angeles Angels Official Bio

1968 births
Living people
American people of Cuban descent
American television sports announcers
Arizona Diamondbacks announcers
Lewis–Clark State Warriors baseball players
Los Angeles Angels announcers
Major League Baseball broadcasters
Minor League Baseball broadcasters
Minor league baseball players
MLB Network personalities
People from Miami
People from Overland Park, Kansas
Texas Rangers (baseball) announcers